The 54th Bodil Awards were held on 4 March 2001 in the Imperial Cinema in Copenhagen, Denmark, honouring the best national and foreign films of 2000. Peter Mygind and Birgitte Raaberg hosted the event which was broadcast live on DR2.

The Bench won both the awards for Best Film and Best Actor in a leading and supporting role (Jesper Christensen and Nikolaj Kopernikus). The award for Best Actress in a Leading Role went to Björk (Dancer in the Dark) while the Best Actress in a Supporting Role award went to  Lene Tiemroth for her performance in Italian For Beginners, the film which had come to the ceremony with most nominations. The only Danish award which did not go to a Zentropa production was the award for Best Cinematographer which went to Eric Kress for his work both on A Place Nearby, Flickering Lights and Miracle.

American Beauty earned the award for Best American Film while the award for Best Non-American Film went to Crouching Tiger, Hidden Dragon.

Producers Ib Tardini and Vibeke Windeløv together with managing director Peter Aalbæk Jensen received a Bodil Honorary Award for their work in Zentropa.

Winners and nominees

Best Danish Film 
The Bench – Per Fly Flickering Lights – Anders Thomas Jensen
 Dancer in the Dark – Lars von Trier
 Italian For Beginners – Lone Scherfig
 Miracle – Natasha Arthy

 Best Actor in a Leading Role Jesper Christensen – The Bench
 Anders W. Berthelsen – Italian For Beginners
 Peter Gantzler – Italian For Beginners
 Thure Lindhardt – A Place Nearby
 Søren Pilmark – Flickering Lights

Best Actress in a Leading Role 
Björk – Dancer In The Dark
 Ann Eleonora Jørgensen – Italian For Beginners Ghita Nørby – A Place Nearby
 Annette Støvelbæk – Italian For Beginners

 Best Actor in a Supporting Role Nicolaj Kopernikus – The Bench Henning Moritzen – A Place Nearby
 Ole Thestrup – Flickering Lights

 Best Actress in a Supporting Role Lene Tiemroth – Italian For Beginners Sarah Boberg – The Bench
 Stine Holm Joensen – The Bench

 Johan Ankerstjerne Cinematographer Award Eric Kress – A Place Nearby, Flickering Lights and Miracle Best American Film American Beauty Being John Malkovich
 The Insider
 Magnolia

 Best Non-American Film Crouching Tiger, Hidden Dragon''' Chicken Run East Is East Together The Road Home''

Bodil Honorary Awards 
 Ib Tardini, Vibeke Windeløv and Peter Aalbæk Jensen for their work in Zentropa

References 

2000 film awards
Bodil Awards ceremonies
2001 in Copenhagen
March 2001 events in Europe